Broken Barriers is a 1928 American silent drama film directed by Burton L. King and starring Helene Costello, Gaston Glass and Joseph W. Girard. The film is currently lost.

Cast
 Helene Costello as Beryl Moore 
 Gaston Glass as Charles Hill 
 Joseph W. Girard as Stanley Moore 
 Frank Beal as George Austin 
 Carl Stockdale as Thomas Walker 
 Frank Hagney as James Barker

References

Bibliography
 Munden, Kenneth White. The American Film Institute Catalog of Motion Pictures Produced in the United States, Part 1. University of California Press, 1997.

External links

1928 films
1928 drama films
Silent American drama films
Films directed by Burton L. King
American silent feature films
1920s English-language films
American black-and-white films
1928 lost films
Lost American films
Lost drama films
1920s American films